Alan Gray is an American politician serving as a member of the Missouri House of Representatives from the 75th district. Elected in 2016, he assumed office in 2017.

Early life and education 
Gray was born and raised in St. Louis, Missouri. After graduating from Southwest High school, he attended St. Louis Community College.

Career 
Gray served in the United States Marine Corps. He later worked for the Missouri Department of Transportation. Gray has since worked as an installation technician for Lucent. Gray is a member of the Communications Workers of America and International Brotherhood of Electrical Workers. He was elected to the Missouri House of Representatives in 2016 and assumed office in 2017. During his tenure, Gray has served as ranking member of the House Special Committee on Homeland Security.

Electoral History

References 

Living people
Year of birth missing (living people)
Politicians from St. Louis
Democratic Party members of the Missouri House of Representatives
African-American state legislators in Missouri
21st-century African-American people